Sir Thomas Eric St Johnston, CBE, KStJ, QPM, TD (7 January 1911 – 17 March 1986) was Chief Inspector of Constabulary from 1967 until 1970.

St Johnson was educated at Bromsgrove School and Corpus Christi College, Cambridge, where he was a friend of the writer Nigel Balchin. He joined the civilian staff of Scotland Yard; and was admitted a barrister at the Middle Temple in 1934. In 1940 he became Chief Constable of Oxfordshire, in 1944 of the Durham Police and in 1950 of the Lancashire Force. A former Colonel in the Royal Artillery TA, during World War II he was employed at the War Office. He was Director of Administration for Spencer Stuart & Associates from 1971 until 1975. In 1978 he published his autobiography One Policeman’s Story

Honours

References

|-

1911 births
1986 deaths
People educated at Bromsgrove School
Alumni of Corpus Christi College, Cambridge
British Chief Constables
English recipients of the Queen's Police Medal
Commanders of the Order of the British Empire
Knights Bachelor
Chief Inspectors of Constabulary (England and Wales)
Knights of the Order of St John
Royal Artillery officers
English barristers
20th-century English lawyers
20th-century British Army personnel
War Office personnel in World War II